A species that is extinct in the wild (EW) is one that has been categorized by the International Union for Conservation of Nature as known only by living members kept in captivity or as a naturalized population outside its historic range due to massive habitat loss.

Examples

Examples of species and subspecies that are extinct in the wild include:
Alagoas curassow (last unconfirmed sighting reported in the late 1980s, listed extinct in the wild since 1994)
Beloribitsa
Cachorrito de charco palmal (last seen in 1994, listed extinct in the wild since 1996)
Christmas Island blue-tailed skink (listed extinct in the wild since 2014)
Dabry's sturgeon (listed extinct in the wild since 2022)
Escarpment cycad (listed extinct in the wild since 2006)
Franklinia (last seen in 1803, listed extinct in the wild since 1998)
Golden skiffia (listed extinct in the wild since 1996)
Guam kingfisher (listed extinct in the wild since 1986)
Hawaiian crow or ʻalalā (last seen in 2002, listed as extinct in the wild since 2004) Small groups have since been released in 2017 and 2018. 
Kihansi spray toad (listed extinct in the wild since 2009)
Lister's gecko (listed extinct in the wild since 2014)
Oahu deceptor bush cricket (listed extinct in the wild since 1996)
Panamanian golden frog (possibly extinct in the wild)
Père David's deer (listed extinct in the wild since 2008. However, reintroduction from captive populations began in 1985, with 53 wild herds of varying sizes being recorded in 2003)
Scimitar oryx (listed extinct in the wild since 2000. A herd of 21 was successfully released into the wild in Chad in 2016, producing the first offspring born in the wild in over 20 years in 2017)
Socorro dove (listed extinct in the wild since 1994)
Socorro isopod (last seen in 1988, listed as extinct in the wild since August 1996)
South China tiger (since 2008 IUCN Red List lists as critically endangered; possibly extinct in the wild)
Spix's macaw (listed extinct in the wild since June 2019)
Wyoming toad (listed extinct in the wild since 1991, although 853 have been released into the wild since 1995, leading to a population of around 1,500 in 2017)

The Pinta Island tortoise (Geochelone nigra abingdoni) had only one living individual, named Lonesome George, until his death in June 2012. The tortoise was believed to be extinct in the mid-20th century, until Hungarian malacologist József Vágvölgyi spotted Lonesome George on the Galapagos island of Pinta on 1 December 1971. Since then, Lonesome George has been a powerful symbol for conservation efforts in general and for the Galapagos Islands in particular. With his death on 24 June 2012, the subspecies is again believed to be extinct. With the discovery of 17 hybrid Pinta tortoises located at nearby Wolf Volcano a plan has been made to attempt to breed the subspecies back into a pure state.

Not all EW species are rare. An example is the Brugmansia family, where all seven species are widely cultivated but none are found in the wild. Ultimately, the purpose of preserving biodiversity is to maintain ecological function so when a species exists only in captivity, it is ecologically extinct.

Reintroduction

Reintroduction is the deliberate release of individuals into the wild, from captivity or from other areas where the species survives. However, it may be difficult to reintroduce EW species into the wild, even if their natural habitats were restored, because survival techniques, which are often passed from parents to offspring during parenting, may have been lost. 

An example of a successful reintroduction of a formerly EW species is Przewalski's horse, which as of 2018 is considered to be an endangered species, following reintroduction started in the 1990s.

See also
IUCN Red List extinct in the wild species for a list by taxonomy
:Category:IUCN Red List extinct in the wild species for an alphabetical list
Extinction
Local extinction
Lists of extinct species

References

External links
List of Extinct in the Wild species as identified by the IUCN Red List of Threatened Species

 
Biota by conservation status
IUCN Red List
Wild, Extinct in the (EW)
Zoos